William Harris is an association football player who represented New Zealand at international level.

Harris made his full All Whites debut as a substitute in a 2–1 win over South Korea on 19 October 1980 and ended his international playing career with 6 A-international caps to his credit, his final cap an appearance in a 0–2 loss to Malaysia on 30 October 1980.

References 

Year of birth missing (living people)
Living people
Wellington United players
New Zealand association footballers
New Zealand international footballers
Association football forwards